Harrow West is a constituency in Greater London created in 1945 and represented in the House of Commons of the UK Parliament. Until 1997, it only returned Conservative MPs; since then, it has elected the Labour Co-operative MP Gareth Thomas on a fluctuating majority. Since 2010, this has been bolstered by the loss of Pinner from the seat and the gain of a favourable ward for Labour from Harrow East.

Constituency profile

The area covers the largely Georgian conservation area on a stand-alone, partly park-lined hill which hosts the famous Harrow School; it also includes  the urban Harrow town centre, as well as suburban streets of homes with good-sized gardens and well-kept small parklands. The seat has fast London Underground links to the city centre and rail services, few dual carriageways and few high speed roads.

Political history 
Summary of results
The Labour Party have held the seat since 1997, with the Conservative Party second-placed in each election. The 2015 result made the seat the 215th safest of the party's 232 seats (by majority percentage), and thus the 18th most marginal seat. Thomas's majority has ranged from 2.3% in 1997 to 26.4% in 2017.

Unlike Harrow East, it had always been won by the Conservative Party until Labour's landslide in 1997, when a swing of 17.5% was the eighth-highest swing in that election; it was the safest Tory seat lost to Labour. Its electorate produced another better than average result for Labour in 2001, with a swing from the Conservatives to Labour of 5.4%, bettered in only four seats out of 650. The 2005 challenge by future Conservative MP Mike Freer produced a pro-Conservative swing of 4.5%.

The 2010 inceptive seat saw a notional swing to the Tories in line with that nationally of 5.7%; in overall outcome the incumbent Labour MP's swing increased. The Harrow West and East seats now present as less marginal than they were in previous decades.

After a 1.1% swing to the Tories in 2015, the seat swung to Labour in 2017 by around 11%, with a local record number of votes for their incumbent candidate. At 34.4%, the Conservative vote share was the lowest in the seat's history, but the party received more votes in 2017 than in 2001 and 2010.

Other parties
UKIP, Liberal Democrat and Green Party candidates won less than 5% of the vote in 2015 and 2017, therefore forfeiting their deposits.

Boundaries 

The constituency was created for the 1945 general election when the Harrow constituency was split into the new seats of Harrow East and Harrow West. It was reduced in size for the 1950 general election, when a third Harrow seat, Harrow Central, was created. The Boundary Commission review before the 1983 general election saw the London Borough of Harrow contained in two seats, resulting in Harrow West gaining parts of the abolished Harrow Central.

Labour's union leader Tony McNulty lost the neighbouring Harrow East in 2010 to Blackman, who held on in 2015 and 2017.  However, Harrow West's Gareth Thomas retained his seat with a reduced majority.

2010 boundaries 
Reviewing such representation in North London, the Boundary Commission for England (de facto), as is custom agreed by Parliament, altered the area's limits to avoid malapportionment, as London's housing and rates of occupancy have altered. The western border district, town or neighbourhood of Pinner went to a new cross-Borough seat, Ruislip, Northwood and Pinner, making its source, based on a ward breakdown of the last result, and mirrored by local election results, a stronger seat for Labour; this was coupled with the inclusion of Marlborough ward which had returned many Labour councillors since World War II.

Members of Parliament

Election results

Elections in the 2010s 

''Note: From 2010 historically Conservative-strong Pinner formed part of the new seat Ruislip, Northwood and Pinner. The 2010 changes are not based on the 2005 result as the constituency underwent major changes.

Elections in the 2000s

Elections in the 1990s

Elections in the 1980s

Elections in the 1970s

Elections in the 1960s

Elections in the 1950s

Elections in the 1940s

See also 
List of parliamentary constituencies in London

Notes

References

External links 
Politics Resources (Election results from 1922 onwards)
Electoral Calculus (Election results from 1955 onwards)

Parliamentary constituencies in London
Politics of the London Borough of Harrow
Constituencies of the Parliament of the United Kingdom established in 1945